Rostand Junior M'baï (born 1 July 1995) is a Cameroonian professional football player who currently plays as a forward for the Qatari Second Division club Mesaimeer

Honours

Club

Union Douala
Cameroon Premiere Division: 2012

ES Sahel
Tunisian Cup: 2013–14

References

External links
 
 
 Rostand Junior M'baï at Soccerstats247.com

1995 births
Living people
Cameroonian footballers
Cameroon international footballers
Association football forwards
Union Douala players
Étoile Sportive du Sahel players
Coton Sport FC de Garoua players
Ittihad Tanger players
Al-Mina'a SC players
Mesaimeer SC players
Qatari Second Division players
Cameroonian expatriate footballers
Expatriate footballers in Tunisia
Expatriate footballers in Morocco
Expatriate footballers in Iraq
Expatriate footballers in Qatar
Cameroonian expatriate sportspeople in Tunisia
Cameroonian expatriate sportspeople in Morocco
Cameroonian expatriate sportspeople in Iraq
Cameroonian expatriate sportspeople in Qatar